David Ferrer was the two-time defending champion and successfully defended his title by beating Fabio Fognini in the final 6–4, 6–3.

Seeds

 David Ferrer (champion)
 Fabio Fognini (final)
 Tommy Robredo (semifinals)
 Nicolás Almagro (semifinals)
 Marcel Granollers (second round)
 Robin Haase (quarterfinals, retired because of a back injury)
 Juan Mónaco (first round)
 Jérémy Chardy (quarterfinals)

Draw

Finals

Top half

Bottom half

Qualifying

Seeds

 Stéphane Robert (first round, retired)
 Andreas Haider-Maurer (qualifying competition)
 Diego Sebastián Schwartzman (first round)
 Pere Riba (first round)
 Thomaz Bellucci (first round, retired)
 Facundo Bagnis (first round)
 Martín Alund (qualified)
 Guido Andreozzi (second round)

Qualifiers

Qualifying draw

First qualifier

Second qualifier

Third qualifier

Fourth qualifier

External links
 Main draw
 Qualifying draw

Copa Claro - Singles
2014 Singles